Burke & Wills is a 1985 Australian adventure film directed by Graeme Clifford, starring Jack Thompson and Nigel Havers. The film is based on the ill-fated Burke and Wills expedition across Australia.

The film follows Robert O'Hara Burke and William John Wills in their crossing of Australia's interior in 1860–1. The film's account of the story changes the expedition's ending by having the explorers actually reach the northern coast. This upbeat idea was vehemently criticised by Australian reviewers. The film was released a week after the similarly themed comedy Wills & Burke.

Plot synopsis

Irish explorer Robert O'Hara Burke (Thompson) and British scientist William John Wills (Havers), have set out to make the first maps of the interior region of the Australian continent in 1860. During their journey, they and their compatriots run low on food and suffer from heat exhaustion until there is only one survivor.

Cast

Jack Thompson as Robert O'Hara Burke
Nigel Havers as William John Wills
Greta Scacchi as Julia Matthews
Matthew Fargher as John King
Chris Haywood as Tom McDonagh
Ralph Cotterill as Charley Gray
Drew Forsythe as William Brahe
Ron Blanchard as Bill Patton
Monroe Reimers as Dost Mahomet
Barry Hill as George Landells
Hugh Keays-Byrne as Ambrose Kyte
Roderick Williams as Bill Wright
Arthur Dignam as Sir William Stawell
Ken Goodlet as Doctor John Macadam
Peter Collingwood as Doctor William Wills
Edward Hepple as Ludwig Becker
Susannah Harker as Bessie Wills
Martin Redpath as Mayor of Melbourne
Julia Hamilton as Mrs. Kyte
Nick Carrafa as Edwin Welch
John Gregg as Alfred Erwin
Deryck Barnes as Tom Payne
Les Foxcroft as Harry
John Penman as Fat Kid
Redmond Phillips as Commissioner May
Mark Pegler as Journalist
Mary Acres as Julia's Dresser
David Bracks as Lawyer
Lucy Bell as Kyte's Daughter
Matthew Savage as Christopher Marsden

Production
Graeme Clifford was an Australian who had become a leading editor in Hollywood and had moved into directing. He was interested in making a film about the Burke and Wills expedition and in 1978 approached EMI Films, who had commissioned a script from Terence Rattigan based on the story. This did not work out so Clifford then hired a fellow Australian expatriate, Michael Thomas, to write a screenplay. Early financial assistance was provided by David Williams of Greater Union.

Clifford then went to make his first feature, Frances and discovered that Greater Union's enthusiasm for the film had cooled. However, he received support from Hoyts-Edgley who agreed to finance. The budget would be particularly high because of Clifford's insistence at filming along the actual path of the expedition.

Charlton Heston was once interested in playing Burke but Clifford says he only ever envisioned Jack Thompson in that role. After seeing Chariots of Fire, he wanted Nigel Havers to play Wills, a decision opposed by Actors Equity, but this was overturned at arbitration.

Filming started in September 1984 and took 13 weeks. Many of the original locations were used, such as Coopers Creek, because Clifford thought it was important to be as authentic as possible. Additional filming was completed in England some months later.

Painter Sidney Nolan came out on set and was the film's official painter.

Release
The film premiered in Melbourne on 2 November 1985 before Prince Charles and Lady Diana; the first Australian Royal Premiere. It opened in other Australian cities on 7 November 1985, was shown at the 1986 Cannes Film Festival in May, the Toronto Film Festival in September 1986 and was released worldwide in early 1986.

Burke & Wills performed disappointingly, grossing $1,567,000 at the box office in Australia, (which is equivalent to $3,729,460 in 2009 dollars). Jonathan Chissick later said "people in Australia were just not interested in seeing a picture about these two guys dying in the desert."

The film was released in the US but also performed disappointingly there.

The film was released on VHS Video in Australia by Charter Entertainment in 1987 and released in the USA on 26 October 1988 by Nelson Entertainment.

The film was released on laserdisc in the USA (UPC: 08258902146).

The film was released on DVD in 2014 through Umbrella Entertainment. Although released in Australia on the PAL format, the disc is region free. Umbrella Entertainment used the re-mastered version of the film produced by the National Film and Sound Archive (Australia) as part of the sesquicentenary activities in 2010; the sound was left as 2-speaker stereo. The DVD has no menu on the disc and the film is presented in its original 2.35:1 widescreen format.

Reception
Variety called it "satisfying entertainment despite its length and seemingly downbeat subject."

Accolades

Miscellaneous
A 1975 British documentary series called The Explorers on the BBC featured the Australian expedition story in the episode titled Burke and Wills. Directed by Lord Snowdon, it was narrated by David Attenborough in the UK version (but by Anthony Quinn in the 1976 US broadcast version), and coincidentally the same Australian actor Chris Haywood who played Tom McDonagh also previously appeared in the British documentary released around a decade earlier. Moreover, in the same year as this film, Haywood also played a cameo role of the constable in the Burke & Wills spoof parody Wills & Burke (1985).

See also
Cinema of Australia

References

External links

Burke and Wills at Oz Movies
 Burke & Wills Web A comprehensive website containing many of the historical documents relating to the Burke & Wills Expedition
 The Burke & Wills Historical Society The Burke & Wills Historical Society
 Burke and Wills 150th Anniversary Commemoration Program Burke and Wills 150th Anniversary Commemoration Program

1985 films
Adventure films based on actual events
Australian films based on actual events
1980s adventure drama films
1980s English-language films
Films directed by Graeme Clifford
Films set in colonial Australia
Burke and Wills expedition
Australian adventure drama films
1985 drama films